It (stylized in quotation marks) is a 1927 American silent film directed by Clarence G. Badger and Josef von Sternberg, and starring Clara Bow. It is based on the serialised novella of the same name, republished in "It" and Other Stories (1927), by Elinor Glyn, who adapted the story and appears in the film as herself.

The film was a box office hit and served as Bow's star vehicle, turning her into one of the most popular actresses of the era. It popularized the concept of the "it girl", with the term "it" defined in the opening as the "quality possessed by some which draws all others with its magnetic force."

The film had its world premiere in Los Angeles on January 14, 1927, followed by a New York showing on February 5, 1927. It was released to the general public on February 19, 1927.

The picture was considered lost for many years; however, in the 1960s, a nitrate copy was discovered in Prague. In 2001, It was selected for preservation in the United States National Film Registry by the Library of Congress as being "culturally, historically, or aesthetically significant".

The film's copyright was renewed in 1954, and the film entered the public domain on January 1, 2023.

Plot
Spunky shopgirl Betty Lou Spence (Clara Bow) has a crush on her handsome employer, Cyrus Waltham Jr. (Antonio Moreno), the new manager of and heir to the "world's largest store". However, they belong to different social classes and he is already romantically linked to blonde socialite Adela Van Norman (Jacqueline Gadsden). Cyrus's inept friend, Monty, (William Austin) notices Betty, and she uses him to get closer to Cyrus.

When Betty finally gets Cyrus's attention, she convinces him to take her on a date to Coney Island, where he is introduced to the proletarian pleasures of roller coasters and hot dogs and has a wonderful time. At the end of the evening, he tries to kiss her. She slaps his face and hurries out of his car and into her flat, but then peeks out her window at him as he is leaving.

The next day, meddling welfare workers are trying to take away the baby of Betty's sickly roommate Molly (Priscilla Bonner). To protect her friend, Betty bravely claims that the baby is in fact hers. Unfortunately, this is overheard by Monty, who tells Cyrus. Although he is in love with her, Cyrus offers her an "arrangement" that includes everything but marriage. Shocked and humiliated, Betty Lou refuses. She soon strives to forget the whole ordeal ever occurred, forgetting Cyrus for the time being. When she learns from Monty about Cyrus's misunderstanding, she fumes and vows to teach her former beau a lesson.

When Cyrus hosts a yachting excursion, Betty Lou makes Monty take her along, masquerading as "Miss Van Cortland". Cyrus at first wants to remove her from the ship, but he cannot long resist Betty Lou's it factor; he eventually corners her and proposes marriage, but she gets him back, by telling him that she'd "rather marry his office boy", which accomplishes her goal, but breaks her heart. He then learns the truth about the baby and leaves Monty at the yacht's helm to find her. Monty crashes the yacht into a fishing boat, tossing both Betty Lou and Adela into the water. Betty Lou saves Adela, punching her in the face when she panics and threatens to drown them both. At the end of the film, she and Cyrus reconcile on the anchor of the yacht, with the first two letters of the ship's name, Itola, between them. Monty and Adela are upset at losing their friends, but it is implied they pursue a relationship with each other as the film ends.

The concept of "It" 
The invention of the concept It is generally attributed to Elinor Glyn, but already in 1904, Rudyard Kipling, in the short story "Mrs. Bathurst" introduced It.

In February 1927 Cosmopolitan published a two-part serial story in which Glyn defined It.

Production 

Paramount Pictures paid Glyn $50,000 for the concept, gave her a small part in the film as herself, and gave her a "story and adaptation" credit.

Hope Loring, Louis D. Lighton and George Marion Jr. (intertitles) wrote the screenplay and Carl Sandburg noted that Glyn's magazine story was "not at all like the film, not like it in any respect." In the original version of the story, the character with the magnetic personality was a male. Paramount producers suggested the character be female. Also the original female character, Ava Cleveland, was upper class whereas Betty Lou is working class. Nevertheless, Glyn was fully involved in the film adaptation and was very flexible about the transition.

This is one of the first examples of a "concept film", as well as one of the earlier examples of product placement. The concept of "It" is referred to throughout the film, including the scene where Glyn appears as herself and defines "It" for Mr. Waltham. Cosmopolitan magazine is featured prominently in a scene where the character Monty reads Glyn's story and introduces it to the audience.

Stage actress Dorothy Tree had her first film role in a small, uncredited part. A young Gary Cooper was cast in a minor role as a newspaper reporter.

Cast
 Clara Bow as Betty Lou Spence
 Antonio Moreno as Cyrus T. Waltham
 William Austin as "Monty" Montgomery
 Priscilla Bonner as Molly
 Jacqueline Gadsdon as Adela Van Norman
 Julia Swayne Gordon as Mrs. Van Norman
 Elinor Glyn as Madame Elinor Glyn
 Gary Cooper as Reporter

Reception
It was a hit with audiences all over the United States, breaking box office records. Critics praised the film, especially its star, as "a joy to behold". It turned Clara Bow from an up-and-coming movie actress into the biggest movie star of the 1920s who in the process became a film legend as a result of "It". The term "The It girl" has since entered the cultural lexicon.

See also
 The House That Shadows Built (1931 promotional film by Paramount)
 Manic Pixie Dream Girl
 It girl

References

External links

 It (1927) — complete film on Commons
 
 It essay by Dino Everett on the National Film Registry website
 It essay by Daniel Eagan in America's Film Legacy: The Authoritative Guide to the Landmark Movies in the National Film Registry, A&C Black, 2010 , pages 126-128
 
 
 
 

1927 films
1920s English-language films
1927 romantic comedy films
American romantic comedy films
American silent feature films
American black-and-white films
Famous Players-Lasky films
Films based on British novels
Films directed by Clarence G. Badger
Films set in department stores
Films set in New York City
Films shot in New York City
Paramount Pictures films
United States National Film Registry films
Films set in amusement parks
1920s rediscovered films
Rediscovered German films
Silent romantic comedy films
1920s American films
Silent American comedy films